N3DS may refer to:

Nintendo 3DS, the first system in the Nintendo 3DS family of handheld consoles
New Nintendo 3DS, the fourth system in the Nintendo 3DS family of handheld consoles
Nintendo 3DS line, the entire 3DS series